Caitlin Marie Lotz (born December 30, 1986) is an American actress, dancer and singer. She has portrayed Stephanie Horton in Mad Men, Officer Kirsten Landry in the MTV mockumentary series Death Valley (2011), Annie in The Pact (2013), and Sara Lance/The Canary/White Canary in The CW's Arrowverse television series, where she has appeared in Arrow, Legends of Tomorrow, The Flash, Supergirl, and  Batwoman.  She is also a co-founder of SheThority, a women's empowerment organization.

Career

Dancing and singing
Lotz started her career as a dancer, touring with Avril Lavigne and Lady Gaga, and starring in music videos including Lady Gaga's "Paparazzi", David Guetta and Estelle's "One Love", Selena Gomez's "Tell Me Something I Don't Know", T-Pain's "Freeze", JoJo's "Baby It's You", Cascada's "Evacuate the Dancefloor", Kaci Brown's "Instigator", and Wang Leehom's "Gai Shi Ying Xiong". Lotz appeared on Dancing With the Stars season 8, as Lady Gaga's backup dancer for the song "LoveGame". Her Avril Lavigne tour performance was released on the video The Best Damn Tour: Live in Toronto.

Lotz appeared in TV ads for Jack in the Box, Reebok, and T-Mobile, danced in the web series The Legion of Extraordinary Dancers, toured with the hip hop theatre production Groovaloo, and stunt-doubled in films including Step Up 3D.

In 2005, Lotz joined the girl group Soccx. In 2006, the group released their debut single "From Dusk Till Dawn (Get the Party Started)", which they followed up in 2007 with the single "Scream Out Loud", both of which reached the top 10 in Germany. Their début album, Hold On, was also released in 2007, and their third single, "Can't Take My Eyes Off You", was released in 2008.

Modeling
Lotz has modelled for Men's Health and Esquire, the latter in conjunction with the website Me in My Place.

Acting
Lotz did her acting training at Sanford Meisner for two years. Lotz began her acting career in 2006 with a small role in the cheerleading film Bring It On: All or Nothing. She followed that up in 2010 with a part in the third episode of Law & Order: LA and a recurring role in the fourth season of the AMC drama Mad Men as Stephanie, Anna Draper's niece. In 2011, Lotz starred as Officer Kirsten Landry, one of the main characters in the MTV horror, black comedy mockumentary series Death Valley. Lotz performed all her own stunts on the show.

In 2012, Lotz had roles in Live at the Foxes Den, Battle of the Year alongside Josh Holloway and alongside Casper Van Dien and Agnes Bruckner in the supernatural thriller The Pact, which débuted at the 2012 Sundance Film Festival and has been picked up for distribution.

Starting with the second season of The CW's superhero TV series Arrow, Lotz appeared as Sara Lance, a character believed dead who returns as a costumed vigilante known as The Canary. Lotz reprised her role as Lance in the spin-off series Legends of Tomorrow. She would go on to make her directorial debut in the latter series’s fifth season episode “Mortal Khanbat”.

She had the lead role in the science fiction film The Machine, which had its UK release on March 21, 2014 and had its US release on April 25, 2014. In May 2014, she reprised her role as Stephanie in the seventh season of Mad Men. She also played Dr. Emily McTier in the film 400 Days, along with her Legends of Tomorrow co-star Brandon Routh, in 2016.

Martial arts
Lotz is a martial artist, training in Taekwondo, Wushu, Krav Maga, Arnis and Muay Thai. She is also a practitioner of parkour and tricking.

Personal life
Lotz announced at Starfury Events: Ultimates Crisis, a fan convention in the U.K. that she and Canadian actor Kyle Schmid are engaged. The two married in 2023 in a ceremony in Morocco.

Filmography

Film

Television

Web

Accolades

References

External links

 
 

1986 births
21st-century American actresses
Actresses from San Diego
American female dancers
Dancers from California
American film actresses
American Muay Thai practitioners
American stunt performers
American female taekwondo practitioners
American television actresses
American wushu practitioners
Living people
Female models from California
21st-century American singers
21st-century American women singers
American models
American female models
Rancho Bernardo High School alumni